The following is the list of squads that took place in the baseball tournamentat the 1996 Summer Olympics.

Australia
Jeff Williams
Mark Doubleday
Scott Tunkin
Michael Nakamura
Steven Hinton
Richard Vagg
Andrew Scott
Shane Tonkin
Jason Hewitt
Andrew McNally
Matthew Sheldon-Collins
Peter Vogler
David Hynes
Grant McDonald
Scott Dawes
Stuart Howell
Sten Lindberg
Simon Sheldon-Collins
Stuart Thompson
John Moore

Cuba
Alberto Hernández
Antonio Pacheco
Antonio Scull
Eduardo Paret
Eliécer Montes
Jorge Fumero
José Antonio Estrada
José Contreras
Juan Manrique
Juan Padilla
Lázaro Vargas
Luis Ulacia
Miguel Caldés
Omar Ajete
Omar Linares
Omar Luis
Orestes Kindelán
Ormari Romero
Pedro Luis Lazo
Rey Isaac

Japan
Kosuke Fukudome
Masahiro Nojima
Nobuhiko Matsunaka
Makoto Imaoka
Takao Kuwamoto
Tadahito Iguchi
Yasuyuki Saigo
Hideaki Okubo
Daishin Nakamura
Koichi Misawa
Masao Morinaka
Jutaro Kimura
Takeo Kawamura
Hitoshi Ono
Masahiko Mori
Masanori Sugiura
Takashi Kurosu
Takayuki Takabayashi
Tomoaki Sato
Yoshitomo Tani

Italy
Claudio Liverziani
Pierpaolo Illuminati
Roberto De Franceschi
Davide Rigoli
Marco Ubani
Francesco Casolari
Andrea Evangelisti
Enrico Vecchi
Massimiliano Masin
Paolo Ceccaroli
Ruggero Bagialemani
Paolo Passerini
Massimo Fochi
Alberto D'Auria
Roberto Cabalisti
Dante Carbini
Marco Barboni
Rolando Cretis
Luigi Carrozza
Fabio Betto

Netherlands
Eric de Bruin
André van Maris
Eddie Dix
Geoffrey Kohl
Marcel Joost
Eelco Jansen
Byron Ward
Johnny Balentina
Giel ten Bosch
Jeffrey Cranston
Danny Wout
Tom Nanne
Paul Nanne
Evert-Jan 't Hoen
Marlon Fluonia
Rob Cordemans
Adonis Kemp
Marcel Kruijt
Edsel Martis
Peter Callenbach

Nicaragua
Bayardo Dávila
Martín Alemán
Norman Cardozo
Oswaldo Mairena
Nemesio Porras
José Luis Quiroz
Carlos Alberto Berrios
Sandy Moreno
Omar Obando
Ramón Padilla
Fredy Zamora
Julio César Osejo
Eduardo Bojorge
Asdrudes Flores
Aníbal Vega
Erasmo Baca
Luis Daniel Miranda
Fredy Corea
Jorge Luis Avellán
Henry Roa

South Korea
Son Min-han
Kim Su-gwan
Bae Jae-hyo
Jo In-seong
Gang Hyeok
Jo Jin-ho
Jin Gab-yong
Jo Gyeong-hwan
Lee Dong-uk
Gang Pil-seon
Im Seon-dong
Lee Byeong-gyu
O Cheol-min
Jeon Seung-nam
Kim Yeong-su
Mun Dong-hwan
Na Man-ho
An Hui-bong
Kim Seon-u
Chea Jong-guk

United States
R. A. Dickey
Warren Morris
Augie Ojeda
Mark Kotsay
Jason Williams
Chad Allen
Chad Green
Kip Harkrider
Braden Looper
Travis Lee
A. J. Hinch
Jacque Jones
Brian Loyd
Troy Glaus
Seth Greisinger
Matt LeCroy
Kris Benson
Jim Parque
Jeff Weaver
Billy Koch

References

1996
Team squads